George Davis, born 1868, was an English footballer who played in the English Football League for Aston Villa.

Early career
Nothing is recorded about how Davis came to prominence as a Footballer until two sources site that he signed for St Philip's F.C. in 1888, aged 20/21. Nothing is recorded online about this club. In 1889 George Davis signed for Aston Villa. (Exact date not recorded).

Season 1889-1890
George Davis only got to play one game for the Aston Villa first team as Jimmy Warner, the Villa regular goalkeeper was unavailable. His Club & League debut was on 5 October 1889. The venue was Turf Moor, the home of Burnley. Davis' only top-flight match was a winning appearance as Villa won 6–2. The Lancashire Evening Post described the match in its 5 October 1889 edition reports that Villa were 4-1 up at half-time. Davis was mentioned in the Post' report a couple of times in the Second-Half. "Friel elicited cheers by a long field run, accompanied by Haresnape. They passed through the (Villa) ranks, but were pulled up by Davis," The second reference in the 'Post' was "Haresnape, by a long shot, was fisted out by Davis".

1890 onwards
George Davis left Villa in 1890 (exact date unknown) and signed for Witton White Star F.C.. Nothing is recorded online about this club or when Davis retired from football or his life outside of football. Also, nothing is known about when he passed away.

References

1868 births
English footballers
Association football goalkeepers
Aston Villa F.C. players
English Football League players
Footballers from Birmingham, West Midlands
Year of death missing